Pinelopi "Penny" Koujianou Goldberg (born 1963) is a Greek-American economist who served as chief economist of the World Bank from 2018 until 2020. She holds the named chair of Elihu Professor of Economics at Yale University. She is also a non-resident senior fellow at the Peterson Institute for International Economics.

Early life and education 
Goldberg was born in Athens, Greece. She received a Diplom in economics from the University of Freiburg in 1986 and a PhD from Stanford University in 1992.

Career 
Goldberg teaches at Yale University, where she is the Elihu professor of economics. At Yale, she was initially one of only three female economics professors to have been granted tenure. She previously held faculty positions at Columbia University (1999–2001), Princeton University (1992–99 and 2007–10), and Yale (2001–07 and 2010–present).

In 2011, Goldberg became the first woman appointed as editor-in-chief of the American Economic Review, one of the most prestigious journals in economics. She was the editor-in-chief from 2011 to 2016 and co-editor from 2010–2016 and in 2017.

Goldberg was appointed by Jim Yong Kim as the chief economist of the World Bank on April 27, 2018, and joined in November 2018. During her time in office, she was on public service leave from Yale University. In February 2020, she announced that she would resign effective March 1, 2020, to return to her position at Yale. She was succeeded by Aart Kraay, director of research in the Development Research Group, as interim chief economist until a permanent successor could be found. She did not state her reasons for resigning, but The Economist speculated that displeasure at senior World Bank officials, who are alleged to have suppressed research finding that some World Bank foreign aid is captured by local elites, may have played a role.

Goldberg is a member of the U.S. National Academy of Sciences, a fellow of American Academy of Arts and Sciences, fellow of the Econometric Society and its president for 2021, a faculty research associate of the National Bureau of Economic Research, a member of the board of BREAD (Bureau for Research and Economic Analysis of Development), and a research affiliate of the International Growth Centre of the London School of Economics. She is a recipient of the John Simon Guggenheim Memorial Foundation fellowship  and the Bodossaki Prize in social sciences.

Research 
Goldberg's dozens of published works focus on applied microeconomics, international trade, and industrial organization. More recently, she has studied the impact of trade liberalization on growth and the income distribution, the effects of intellectual property rights enforcement in developing countries, and the determinants of incomplete exchange-rate pass-through.

In joint work with Nina Pavcnik, Amit Khandelwal, Petia Topalova, and Jan De Loecker, Goldberg has studied the effects of the 1990s trade liberalization in India on domestic production and the variety of products available in the domestic Indian market and on the costs faced by Indian producers.

In a paper published in the Quarterly Journal of Economics in 2020, jointly written with economists Pablo K. Fajgelbaum, Patrick J. Kennedy, and Amit K. Khandelwal, Goldberg analyzed the effects of the 2018 Trump tariffs and China–United States trade war on the US economy and estimated losses of $68.8 billion to consumers and producers due to higher prices. The total effect, which also accounts for the benefits of higher prices to US producers and government revenue from tariffs, was estimated to be $7.8 billion. The authors further analyzed the distribution of losses across sectors and counties, finding that workers in tradeable sectors in heavily Republican counties were especially worse off.

Her research on measuring human capital, joint with Simeon Djankov, Noam Angrist and Harry Patrinos, underlies the World Bank's Human Capital Index.

More recently, Goldberg has worked to write about the lack of importance of waiving vaccine patents. She argues against the current push by the WHO and by many other global organizations by stating that production capacity is not the main constraint that individuals face in attaining vaccination, thus discrediting the argument for major companies waiving vaccine patents. Goldberg makes the point that greater funding for ordering vaccination and sending surpluses of vaccine production in high-income countries is the main solution to better distribution for the vaccine.

Goldberg has been published in a variety of journals and commended for her research, notably The Quarterly Journal of Economics, American Economic Review, the Handbook of Commercial Policy, and The Annual Review of Economics.

Selected works

References

External links
Guggenheim Foundation Profile 
Goldberg's Website
Goldberg's Curriculum Vitae

1963 births
20th-century American economists
20th-century American women
21st-century American economists
21st-century American women
American Economic Review editors
American women economists
Economics journal editors
Fellows of the American Academy of Arts and Sciences
Fellows of the Econometric Society
Greek emigrants to the United States
Living people
Yale University faculty